Goldwater Lake is a reservoir formed by a dam on Banning Creek, located south of Prescott in North Central Arizona. This lake is maintained by the City of Prescott Parks and Recreation Department. The park has facilities for picnicking, fishing, boating, hiking, volleyball, and horseshoes.

The lake is named for longtime Prescott mayor Morris Goldwater, uncle of U.S. Senator and 1964 Republican Presidential candidate Barry Goldwater.

Fish species

 Largemouth Bass
 Crappie
 Sunfish
 Catfish (Channel)
 Rainbow Trout
 Brook Trout
 Gila Trout
 Crawfish

References

External links
 Arizona Boating Locations Facilities Map
 Arizona Fishing Locations Map
 Video of Goldwater Lake 
  – 
  – 
  – 
 	– 
  – 

Reservoirs in Yavapai County, Arizona
Reservoirs in Arizona